Hochelaga County was a historic county on the Island of Montreal in the province of Quebec. It existed between
1855
and 1921.

Wardens
The county was administered by a council headed by a warden.

Joseph-Octave Villeneuve (1866 to 1880)

Associations
Hochelaga County Agricultural Society (politician Louis Beaubien served as president)

References

NGA GEOnet Names Server (GNS), 18TXR1051648731, http://geonames.nga.mil/ggmagaz/

 By-laws of a financial institution that served this county.

Former counties of Quebec
Geography of Montreal